Takamura Kodama (born 1901, date of death unknown) was a Japanese painter. His work was part of the painting event in the art competition at the 1932 Summer Olympics.

References

1901 births
Year of death missing
20th-century Japanese painters
Japanese painters
Olympic competitors in art competitions
People from Nagano (city)